Bernard Ernest Witkin (May 22, 1904 – December 23, 1995) was an American lawyer and author.  He is best remembered as the founder of the California law treatise, Summary of California Law, which came to be known as "Witkin" and gave rise to the Witkin Library of legal treatises.

Biography
In 1928, Witkin was an unhappy law student at Boalt Hall (UC Berkeley) who thought that the Socratic method used in law school teaching was not an efficient way to learn the law. He seldom went to class and was in danger of flunking out. About the time the dean told him he needed to shape up, Witkin had an epiphany: law is like any other discipline; it has rules that can be taught. He thought legal education should be more like science education and should teach students the rules of the discipline in an organized way. As Samuel Williston and Arthur Linton Corbin had done with their treatises on contracts, Witkin's approach was to reduce case law to black letter rules. He created an outline for each of his courses and started selling his notes to his fellow students.

Following graduation, Witkin took a job with a law firm in San Francisco for two years, while continuing to develop and sell his outlines. Following that job, Witkin clerked for the California Supreme Court. At the same time, he started to teach a bar review course.

Witkin later clerked for the Chief Justice of the California Supreme Court. Around the same time, Witkin developed his outlines into a lengthy hardcover book arranged by subject matter.

In 1940, Witkin became the California Reporter of Decisions.  In that role, Witkin standardized the rules of appellate practice and wrote the California Style Manual. Later he became interested in judicial education and legal reform. Over the years, his Summary of California Law grew into four inter-related treatises, which still reflect his original work.

In 1968, Witkin gave a speech roasting each member of the California Supreme Court, and displayed his trademark colorful good humor.

Witkin died in 1995 at the age of 92.

Honors and legacy
Witkin's treatises continue to be updated by the Witkin Legal Institute. Among many other honors, the California State Law Library is named in his honor. His collection of science fiction publications is held by the University of California, Davis Library. Just prior to his death in 1995, he and his wife received the Benjamin Ide Wheeler Award for service to the City of Berkeley. On March 27, 1983, Loyola Law School awarded Witkin the St. Thomas More Medallion, with speeches by former justices Otto Kaus and Donald R. Wright.

In San Diego, the Law Library Justice Foundation holds an annual awards ceremony in honor of Bernard E. Witkin. The Bernard E. Witkin Award honors members of the legal community for civic leadership and excellence in teaching, practice, enactment, or adjudication of the law.

Personal life
In 1978, he married Alba B. Pichetto Kuchman (November 15, 1919 – December 26, 2014), who helped establish his charitable foundation. He was previously married to Gladys L. Burke Schwatka (m. 1957, div. 1968), and also Jane F. Kauffman Lemert (m. 1969), an arts patron who died on August 10, 1977. In 1981, Witkin donated Jane's art collection to the Crocker Art Museum in Sacramento, California.

See also
 California Reporter of Decisions

References

Sources

External links
Witkin Legal Institute
Witkin Legal Institute - Bernard E. Witkin Biographical Information
Law Library Justice Foundation's Bernard E. Witkin Awards
In Memoriam Bernard E. Wikin. California Supreme Court Historical Society.

1904 births
1995 deaths
California lawyers
University of California, Berkeley alumni
UC Berkeley School of Law alumni
20th-century American lawyers
American legal writers
American legal scholars
American scholars of constitutional law
People from Holyoke, Massachusetts
People from Berkeley, California
American art patrons